Zainutdin Ataev (born 26 October 1991) is a Dagestani Russian para taekwondo practitioner. He won one of the bronze medals in the men's +75 kg event at the 2020 Summer Paralympics in Tokyo, Japan. He competed at the Summer Paralympics under the flag of the Russian Paralympic Committee.

References

Living people
1991 births
People from Buynaksk
Russian male taekwondo practitioners
Taekwondo practitioners at the 2020 Summer Paralympics
Medalists at the 2020 Summer Paralympics
Paralympic bronze medalists for the Russian Paralympic Committee athletes
Paralympic medalists in taekwondo
Sportspeople from Dagestan
21st-century Russian people
20th-century Russian people